Ukerewe  is the fifth-largest lake island in the world.

A ferry crossing of  links the island to a dirt road on the eastern lake shore, which runs to Kibara and the city of Musoma in Mara Region. The shoreline of Ukerewe Island is carved into numerous bays and it is surrounded by at least a dozen smaller islands. Its largest community is the town of Nansio.

Ukerewe island is known for having a large population of Africans with albinism. Many of the first of them to live there were taken to and abandoned on the island by their families as children. Despite comprising an exceptionally high percentage of the island's population, they are still, as throughout Tanzania, an oppressed minority on the island, though it appears to have avoided the killings of albinos, who are "harvested" for black magic rituals, that regularly occurs in Tanzania.

Gallery

Notable People
Alex Magaga - this musician is an activist, documentary producer and member of the Tanzania Albinism Collective.
Aniceti Kitereza (1896–1981) was a Tanzanian Catholic cleric and novelist, born in 1896 on the island of Ukerewe.

See also 
 Kerewe people

References

External links 
 Detailed map of Ukerewe Island and Ukara Island

Lake islands of Tanzania
Islands of Lake Victoria